Dayuan is a station on the Taoyuan Airport MRT located in Dayuan District, Taoyuan City, Taiwan. It opened for commercial service on 2 March 2017.

This elevated station has two side platforms and two tracks. Only Commuter trains stop at this station. It opened for trial service on 2 February 2017, and for commercial service 2 March 2017.

History
Construction on the station began on 18 September 2008. The station opened for commercial service on 2 March 2017 with the opening of the Taipei-Huanbei section of the Airport MRT.

Around the Station

 Hengfeng Riverside Park (850m north of the station)
 Dayuan Night Market (1.9km northwest of the station)
 Guojuyang Umbrella Cultural and Creative Park (國巨洋傘文創園區) (3.2km northwest of the station)
 Yangrong Leisure Farm (陽榮休閒農場) (3.4km southwest of the station)

Exits
Exit 1: Hengnan 1st Road

See also
 Taoyuan Metro

References

Railway stations opened in 2017
2017 establishments in Taiwan
Taoyuan Airport MRT stations